Derek Alan Angus  (born 21 February 1938) is a former New Zealand politician of the National Party. He served as MP for Wallace from 1981 to 1990.

Early life and family
Angus was born in Lumsden on 21 February 1938, and educated at Waitaki Boys' High School. In 1961, he married Thelma Frances Hazley, and the couple went on to have three children.

Angus played representative rugby union for Northern Southland, West Otago and South Otago. He spent 25 years working as a stock buyer for a freezing company.

Political career
Angus served as a Winton borough councillor for six years. He was later elected to the Southland District Council and the Southland Regional Council in 1989. He was a member of the Guardians of Lakes Te Anau and Manapouri, and served on the Southland Conservation Board.

Active in the National Party, Angus chaired the Winton branch from 1971 to 1972, and was chair of the Wallace electorate for seven years. He served as a member of the Otago-Southland divisional executive from 1974 to 1981 and was a National Party dominion councillor from 1977 to 1981.

He represented the Wallace electorate in Parliament from 1981 to 1990, when he retired. He was replaced by Bill English. During his time in parliament, Angus variously served on the states revision, lands and agriculture, and electoral law reform select committees, and was National Party spokesperson for forestry and lands. He was a New Zealand representative at the 1985 Commonwealth Parliamentary Association conference in London, and at the 1990 Australasian and Pacific regional parliamentary seminar.

In the 1990 Queen's Birthday Honours, Angus was awarded the Queen's Service Medal for public services. The same year, he was awarded the New Zealand 1990 Commemoration Medal.

References

1938 births
Living people
People from Lumsden, New Zealand
People educated at Waitaki Boys' High School
Local politicians in New Zealand
New Zealand National Party MPs
Recipients of the Queen's Service Medal
Members of the New Zealand House of Representatives
New Zealand MPs for South Island electorates
Southland regional councillors